Bellemerea alpina, the brown sunken disk lichen, is a white to pale tan, thick crustose areolate lichen that grows on rock in the mountains worldwide. It grows in arctic-alpine habitats in Eurasia, North America (south to California and Arizona), Australia, and New Zealand. Areoles are sometimes contiguous and sometimes dispersed. It often has very visible black prothallus. The brown to tan apothecia have a purplish tinge and are grayed by a pruinose coating, and embedded in the areoles, giving a similar appearance to members of the genus Aspicilia.

References

Lecideales
Lichen species
Lichens described in 1826
Lichens of Asia
Lichens of Europe
Lichens of North America
Lichens of Australia
Lichens of New Zealand
Lichens of the Arctic